Qaed Salim Sinan al-Harethi a.k.a. Abu Ali al-Harithi (died November 3, 2002) was an al-Qaeda operative and a citizen of Yemen who is suspected of having been involved in the October 2000 USS Cole bombing, and the October Limburg attack.

He was killed by the CIA during a covert targeted killing mission in Yemen on November 3, 2002. It was the first known drone strike outside of Afghanistan.

Al-Harithi was traveling with Kamal Derwish (Ahmed Hijazi), a US citizen, and Derwish's killing was the first known case of the U.S. government killing a U.S. citizen during the "War on Terror". It was also the first Predator attack outside Afghanistan.

The George W. Bush administration, citing the authority of a presidential finding that permitted worldwide covert actions against Osama bin Laden's network, considered al-Harethi and his traveling party a justifiable military target. Nonetheless, the targeted killing of al-Harethi was the subject of debate on its legality.

See also
 CIA activities in Yemen

References

External links
 Steve Scher on Weekday February 23, 2007 KUOW-FM  interviews James Bamford on the National Security Agency (Note: minutes 21–24 of 54 minute audio)

Yemeni al-Qaeda members
Assassinated al-Qaeda members
2002 deaths
Deaths by drone strikes of the Central Intelligence Agency in Yemen
Year of birth missing
People from Sanaa